Dissani is a village in the Kara Region of northern Togo. 
Nearby towns and villages include Koupagou (1.0 nm), Kouatie (2.2 nm), Bako Samaba (4.1 nm), Koudan-Mangou (4.5 nm), Kouba Tie (2.0 nm) and Animene Tie (1.4 nm).

References

External links
Satellite map at Maplandia.com

Populated places in Kara Region